{{Infobox power station
| name = Dorper Wind Power Station
| name_official = 
| image = Dorper Wind Farm Project - Molteno - panoramio.jpg
| image_caption = Dorper Wind Farm in 2014
| image_alt = 
| country = South Africa
| pushpin_map = South Africa
| coordinates = 
| location = Molteno, Eastern CapeEnoch Mgijima Local Municipality
| status = O
| construction_began = 2018
| commissioned = 2020
| decommissioned = 
| cost = 
| owner = '| operator = 
| wind_farm_type = Onshore
| ps_units_manu_model = Nordex  N100 2.5MW wind turbines
| wind_hub_height = 
| wind_rotor_diameter = 
| wind_rated_speed = 
| wind_site_elevation = 
| wind_site_usage = 
| wind_site_area = 
| ps_electrical_capacity = 100 MW
| ps_units_operational = 40
| ps_electrical_cap_fac = 
| ps_annual_generation = 513 GWh
| website = dorperwindfarm.co.za
| extra = 
}}

The Dorper Wind Power Station''' is an operational  wind power plant located in the Eastern Cape province in South Africa.

Commercial operations of the power station has started in 2020, and the energy generated is sold to the South African national electricity utility company Eskom, under a 20-year power purchase agreement (PPA).

Location
The power station is located near Molteno, in the Enoch Mgijima Local Municipality, in the Eastern Cape Province.

Overview

The power station is made of 40 wind turbines of the Nordex N100 variety, each rated at 2.5 megawatts for total capacity of 100 MW.

Developers
The power station was developed and is owned by a consortium of international IPPs and financiers. The power station was built, funded and is operated by a consortium referred made of Sumitomo Corporation and Rainmaker Energy.

See also

 List of power stations in South Africa

References

External links

Economy of the Eastern Cape
Wind farms in South Africa
Energy infrastructure in Africa
2020 establishments in South Africa
Energy infrastructure completed in 2020
Enoch Mgijima Local Municipality
21st-century architecture in South Africa